Cardinal Pole Catholic School is a mixed, voluntary aided secondary school located in the Homerton area of the London Borough of Hackney, United Kingdom. Following the 'Building Schools for the Future' programme, all pupils (years 7-13) are housed in the same building on Morning Lane. It is named after Cardinal Reginald Pole, the last Roman Catholic Archbishop of Canterbury.

Religion 
Cardinal Pole is a Roman Catholic school although it admits non-Catholic pupils. A religious assembly attended by staff and pupils is held five times a week. On occasion, Masses replace general assembly. Every pupil is required to take Religious Education at GCSE level, in keeping with the school's religious ethos. A non-examination Religious Education Programme is also followed by all sixth-form students.

Notable people
Kenny Thomas
Darren Purse
Abs Breen
Lily Loveless
David J. Bronstein (Photographer)
Oscar Murillo, artist and 2019 Turner Prize winner

References

External links
Cardinal Pole RC School site

Secondary schools in the London Borough of Hackney
Catholic secondary schools in the Archdiocese of Westminster
Voluntary aided schools in London
Educational institutions established in 1956
Homerton
1956 establishments in England